Nabarangpur Lok Sabha constituency (formerly known as Nowrangpur Lok Sabha constituency) is one of the 21 Lok Sabha (parliamentary) constituencies in Odisha state in eastern India.

Assembly segments
Before delimitation in 2008, the legislative assembly segments which constituted this parliamentary constituency were: Malkangiri, Chitrakonda, Kotpad, Nabarangpur, Kodinga, Dabugam, Umarkote.

Following delimitation, at present, this constituency comprises the following legislative assembly segments:

Members of Parliament
Elected members of this constituency are:

2019: Ramesh Chandra Majhi, BJD
2014: Balabhadra Majhi, BJD
2009: Pradeep Kumar Majhi, Congress
2004: Parsuram Majhi, Bharatiya Janata Party
1999: Parsuram Majhi, Bharatiya Janata Party
1998: Khagapati Pradhani, Congress
1996: Khagapati Pradhani, Congress
1991: Khagapati Pradhani, Congress
1989: Khagapati Pradhani, Congress
1984: Khagapati Pradhani, Congress
1980: Khagapati Pradhani, Congress
1977: Khagapati Pradhani, Congress
1971: Khagapati Pradhani, Congress
1967: Khagapati Pradhani, Congress
1962: Jagannath Rao, Congress
1957: Constituency does not exist
1952: Ponnada Subba Rao, Ganatantra Parishad

Election Results

2019 Election Result

2014 Election
In 2014 election, Biju Janata Dal candidate Balabhadra Majhi defeated Indian National Congress candidate Pradeep Kumar Majhi by a margin of 2,042 votes.
In Nabarangpur, NOTA received 44408 votes (5%) which is significantly higher than the victory margin.

General Election 2009

References

External links
Nabarangpur lok sabha  constituency election 2019 date and schedule

 

Lok Sabha constituencies in Odisha
Nabarangpur district
Malkangiri district
Koraput district